Maya Maron (born ) is an Israeli actress, an Ophir Award winner.

Early life
Maron was raised in Tel Aviv, Israel. She is the youngest of four siblings. Her mother, an office manager, was born in Siberia, where her family fled from Poland before World War II. Her father was born in Eastern Europe and is a diamond dealer. She grew up on Balfour Street in Tel Aviv. When she was 12, her parents divorced after 24 years of marriage.

Maron went to the primary and secondary of School for the Arts Tel Aviv. During the fourth grade she was sent to the theater track, but did not stand out. In 1996, during the summer vacation between ninth and tenth grade, she was scouted in the Arad music festival and cast in Ari Folman's film Saint Clara, later she was nominated for the Ophir Award as a supporting actress in that film. She started high school at the notable Thelma Yellin High School for the Arts majoring in theatre, but a year later she moved to Ironi He, a regular municipal high school. She was not enlisted to the Israel Defense Forces, because she was underweight.

Career
In 1998, Nir Bergman was producing his own film entitled Seahorses to be submitted as his graduation work for the Sam Spiegel Film and Television School, Jerusalem. Maya was cast as the lead role.

In 2002 Bergman cast her in the leading role in Broken Wings. A highly symbolic portrayal of a family living in Haifa and struggling to recover 9 months after the sudden and senseless loss of its father figure (himself appearing only in vague recollections and old family footage). She played the lead role of the daughter struggling to come to terms with her new position as head of the crumbling household, after mother 
Orly Silbersatz Banai shunts the task. The movie won audience approval as well as international and national critical acclaim appearing in numerous international film festivals. The movie won several awards including the Ophir Award for best picture, landing Maya with the best actress award.

Between 2003 and 2004, she played several minor parts in the films She's Not 17 alongside Dalia Shimko and Campfire. In 2005 she again played the lead in a Sam Spiegel student movie dubbed Whatever It Takes (Be'einaim Atsumot), as the fragile and self-destructive partner in a lesbian relationship.

In 2005, she was cast on the Betipul television series as a suicidal gymnast. She played the fiancee of the character played by Yehuda Levi in the crime series The Arbitrator ("Haborer"), and in 2009, she was cast in the lead role on the melodrama Weeping Susannah on HOT3.

In 2006 and 2007, her acting projects included a theatre role as Strophe in Phaedra's Love, Sarah Kane's modern take on the mythological tale of Phaedra and Hippolytus.

In 2015, she featured in several episodes of the second series of Shtisel portraying Hadassah Levi, a painter.

Filmography

Television

References

External links
 

1980 births
Living people
Israeli people of Soviet descent
Israeli television actresses
Israeli film actresses
Thelma Yellin High School of Arts alumni
Israeli child actresses